John Copeland Cole (died 23 April 1987) was an Irish politician. He was a member of Seanad Éireann from 1957 to 1969. He was nominated by the Taoiseach Éamon de Valera in 1957 to the 9th Seanad. He was nominated by Seán Lemass in 1961 and 1965 to the 10th and 11th Seanads respectively. He did not contest the 1969 Seanad election.

He was a member of the Orange Order and was grand master of the County Cavan lodge. His father John James Cole was a Teachta Dála (TD) for the Cavan constituency, elected on five occasions between 1923 and 1943.

See also
Families in the Oireachtas

References

Year of birth missing
1987 deaths
Independent TDs
Members of the 9th Seanad
Members of the 10th Seanad
Members of the 11th Seanad
Irish farmers
Nominated members of Seanad Éireann
Independent members of Seanad Éireann